Maulud is a Sindhi form of poetry about Muhammad's life, with poems consisting of between five and ten verses. The form developed from the earlier forms vā'ī and kafi.

References

Sindhi poetry
Sindhi culture